Know Your Place was a short-lived BBC Radio 2 sitcom from the early 1980s, set in Worthing Court, a rundown Edwardian block of flats in Bloomsbury, London. The storyline centred around a series of conflicts - and the longstanding frisson - between the elderly caretaker 'the remarkable' Ramsay Potts (played by Roy Dotrice) and his assertive cleaner Elspeth Spurgeon (Patricia Hayes). They are further frustrated by management demands and occasional brushes with tenants. The title refers to the UK's enduring class system, with the associated deference of the cleaner to the caretaker and in turn, the caretaker to the management. Actors who appeared in more than one episode included Pat Coombs, Jon Blythe, Jon Glover, John Graham, Norma Ronald and James Taylor.

Storylines bear some similarities with the long-running The Men from the Ministry and the later Radio 2 series Mind Your Own Business. All three were produced by Edward Taylor.

The sitcom ran for two series in 1982–3. Both series were written by Andrew Palmer and Nell Brennan. Eight episodes have since been repeated on Radio 4 Extra.

Programmes

Series 1, 28 January – 11 March 1982

Series 2, 16 June – 2 August 1983

Programmes marked * have been repeated on Radio 4 Extra.

References

BBC Radio 2 programmes
BBC Radio comedy programmes
1982 radio programme debuts
1983 radio programme endings